The 1921 Estonian Football Championship was the first football league season in Estonia. It was played as a knock-out tournament between September 25 and October 13. Four teams took part in the competition – three from Tallinn and one from Narva. All the games were played at Tiigiveski Ground in Tallinn and refereed by Alexander McKibbin.
Top scorer was Heinrich Paal with 3 goals, followed by Vladimir Tell and Oskar Üpraus with two. VS Sport Tallinn won 5–3 against Tallinna Jalgpalli Klubi and thus became the first ever champions of Estonia.

Semi-finals

‡ After normal time, the match was to be played until the first goal, but after 130 minutes and no goals it was abandoned due darkness.

Replay

Final

References

Estonian Football Championship
1